The 1984–85 Algerian Championnat National was the 23rd season of the Algerian Championnat National since its establishment in 1962. A total of 20 teams contested the league, with GCR Mascara as the defending champions, The Championnat started on September 31, 1984 and ended on May 26, 1985.

Team summaries

Promotion and relegation 
Teams promoted from Algerian Division 2 1984-1985 
 IRB Relizane
 ISM Aïn Béïda
 JH Djazaïr

Teams relegated to Algerian Division 2 1985-1986
 MP Alger
 RS Kouba
 JCM Tiaret

League table

References

External links
1984–85 Algerian Championnat National

Algerian Championnat National
Championnat National
Algerian Ligue Professionnelle 1 seasons